Meløy is a municipality in Nordland county, Norway. It is part of the Salten traditional region. The administrative centre of the municipality is the village of Ørnes. Other villages include Eidbukta, Neverdal, Glomfjord, Halsa, Reipå, Støtt, and Ågskardet.

The municipality is situated just to the north of the Arctic Circle on Norway's west coast. It encompasses the island of Meløya and some 700 other islands of various sizes around the Meløyfjorden, Glomfjorden, and Holandsfjorden in the south, along with a stretch of mainland coast.

The  municipality is the 133rd largest by area out of the 356 municipalities in Norway. Meløy is the 153rd most populous municipality in Norway with a population of 6,214.

General information

The municipality of Meløy was established on 1 January 1884 when the large Rødøy Municipality was separated into Rødøy (population: 1,945) in the south and Meløy (population: 2,696) in the north. The municipal borders have not changed since then.

Name
The municipality (originally the parish) is named after the island of Meløya (Old Norse: Mjǫlva), since the first Meløy Church was built there. The old name of the island is probably derived from mjǫl which means "flour" or "meal" (referring to fine sand on the beaches of the island). The last element øy which means "island" was added to the name around 1500. Historically, the name was spelled Melø.

Coat of arms
The coat of arms was granted on 7 December 1984. The official blazon is "Azure, a poppy plant Or". This means the arms have a blue field (background) and the charge is a subspecies of the arctic poppy plant locally known as Svartisvalmue (Papaver radicatum subglobosum). The poppy plant has a tincture of Or which means it is commonly colored yellow, but if it is made out of metal, then gold is used. The municipality is located near the second largest glacier in continental Norway, the Svartisen (black ice), and the plant is one of the plants found growing closest to the ice. The colors symbolize the blue glacial ice and the yellow flowers. The arms were designed by Rolf Tidemann after the original ideda by Knut Sørensen.

Churches
The Church of Norway has three parishes within the municipality of Meløy. It is part of the Bodø domprosti (arch-deanery) in the Diocese of Sør-Hålogaland.

History

Meløy has been inhabited for many centuries and still possesses various relics from the Viking Age. The Benkestok family, one of Norway's original noble families, established one of its seats at Meløy gård (farm) on the island of Meløya in the 16th century.

Due to the expansion of the community during the 19th century, it was split from its southern neighbour Rødøy in 1884. Its administrative centre was originally on Meløya, but it was later moved to the mainland coastal village of Ørnes. Ørnes is one of the stops on the route of the Hurtigruten (coastal express boat), with a notably scenic entrance via the fjord.

The second largest glacier in Norway, Svartisen, is a target for passenger visits. The mountains around Glomfjord are popular for fishing and hunting as well as skiing in the winter time.

Government
All municipalities in Norway, including Meløy, are responsible for primary education (through 10th grade), outpatient health services, senior citizen services, unemployment and other social services, zoning, economic development, and municipal roads. The municipality is governed by a municipal council of elected representatives, which in turn elect a mayor.  The municipality falls under the Salten District Court and the Hålogaland Court of Appeal.

Municipal council
The municipal council of Meløy is made up of 23 representatives that are elected to four year terms. The party breakdown of the council is as follows:

Geography

The municipality of Meløy is a coastal community that includes many of the surrounding islands. Many parts of the mainland were fairly isolated until road tunnels were built during the 20th century that connected them to the rest of Norway. Some of the main islands of Meløy are Åmøya, Meløya, Bolga, Mesøya, Grønøya, and Støttvær. Åmøya is connected to the mainland via the Brattsund Bridge. The other islands are all accessible by boat or ferry only. The Kalsholmen Lighthouse is located in the southwestern part of the municipality.

The Vestfjorden passes Meløy in the northwest, and the Meløyfjorden, Glomfjorden, and Holandsfjorden cut into the mainland from the west. The Saltfjellet–Svartisen National Park is located in the southeast in the Saltfjellet mountain range, surrounding the Svartisen glacier.

Economy
The industrial development—and thus the main contributor to the economic development and growth of the Meløy community—started around the time of World War I. It was based on electrical power production in then new Glomfjord power plant from water coming from the Svartisen glacier and the lake Storglomvatnet and gathered in the mountains. In the bottom of Glomfjorden, Norsk Hydro (today YARA) started out producing fertilizers in Glomfjord, today yara is Meløy's biggest workplace with 190 people working there

A conglomerate of industries is found there today in Glomfjord Industry Park. The municipality's overall industries are some light industry, agriculture, forestry, fishing, salmon production, and tourism.

Meløy Energi, an electrical power company, is one of the most important employers in the municipality (as of Q4 2022).

Notable people 
 Eindride Sommerseth (1918 – 2010), Norwegian trade unionist and politician
 Arne Pettersen (1906 - 1981), Norwegian sailor, last person to leave Ellis Island.

References

External links
Municipal fact sheet from Statistics Norway 

Video from Engabreen • Svartisen

 
Municipalities of Nordland
Populated places of Arctic Norway
1884 establishments in Norway